Benjamin I of Jerusalem was the 2nd-century 6th bishop of Jerusalem.
According to Eusebius of Caesarea he was a Jewish Christian.
His short episcopacy was only from about 116 to 117 AD. He was possibly killed in the persecution of Hadrian (117–138),
His Feast Day was December 11.

References

2nd-century bishops of Jerusalem
2nd-century Christian saints
Year of birth unknown